In the run up to the 2023 Spanish local elections, various organisations carry out opinion polling to gauge voting intention in local entities in Spain. Results of such polls for municipalities in Andalusia are displayed in this article. The date range for these opinion polls is from the previous local elections, held on 26 May 2019, to the day the next elections will be held, on 28 May 2023.

Polls are listed in reverse chronological order, showing the most recent first and using the dates when the survey fieldwork was done, as opposed to the date of publication. Where the fieldwork dates are unknown, the date of publication is given instead. The highest percentage figure in each polling survey is displayed with its background shaded in the leading party's colour. If a tie ensues, this is applied to the figures with the highest percentages. The "Lead" columns on the right shows the percentage-point difference between the parties with the highest percentages in a given poll.

Municipalities

Almería

Cádiz

Chiclana de la Frontera

Córdoba

El Ejido

El Puerto de Santa María

Fuente de Piedra

Granada

Huelva

Jaén

Jerez de la Frontera

Málaga

Puente Genil

San Roque

Seville

Utrera

Vélez-Málaga

Notes

References

Andalusia
2023